Barah Ruz (also Romanized as Barah Rūz; also known as Barārūz) is a village in Jangal Rural District, in the Central District of Fasa County, Fars Province, Iran. At the 2006 census, its population was 41, in 9 families.

References 

Populated places in Fasa County